Aino Station is the name of three train stations in Japan:

 Aino Station (Hyōgo)  (相野駅) in Hyōgo Prefecture
 Aino Station (Nagasaki)  (愛野駅) in Nagasaki Prefecture
 Aino Station (Shizuoka) (愛野駅) in Shizuoka Prefecture